Events from the year 1564 in art.

Events
February 18 – Michelangelo dies aged 88 in Rome leaving the Rondanini Pietà unfinished.

Paintings
 Pieter Bruegel the Elder
The Adoration of the Kings
The Procession to Calvary

Births

June 11 - Joseph Heintz the Elder, Swiss painter, draftsman and architect (died 1609)
September 13 - Vincenzo Giustiniani, art collector, patron of Caravaggio (died 1637)
November - Francisco Pacheco, Spanish painter and writer on painting (died 1644)
date unknown
Zeng Jing, Chinese painter during the Ming Dynasty (died 1647)
Bartolomé González y Serrano,  Spanish Baroque portrait painter (died 1627)
Hans Rottenhammer, German painter (died 1625)
probable
Pieter Brueghel the Younger, Flemish Renaissance painter (died 1636)
Crispijn van de Passe the Elder, Dutch publisher and engraver (died 1637)

Deaths
February 18 – Michelangelo, Italian Renaissance sculptor, painter, architect and poet (born 1475)
date unknown 
Domenico Campagnola, Italian painter and engraver of the Renaissance period (born c.1500); he was a pupil of his father, the painter Giulio Campagnola.
Cesare da Bagno, Italian sculptor and medallist (born 1530)
Jakob Woller, German sculptor (born 1510)

 
Years of the 16th century in art